Marie Claire Uwumuremyi (born 1979) is a Rwandan politician. Since 2018 she has been a member of the Chamber of Deputies.

Life
Before becoming an MP, Marie Claire Uwumuremyi worked for the Land Bureau, as a District Land Officer and District Land Valuation Officer. She was Chairperson of the National Women Council (CNF) in the Southern Province. On International Day of Rural Women 2011 she encouraged women in Tumba Sector, Huye District, to use opportunities provided by the government, and improve their businesses by taking loans.

In September 2018 she became the MP for Nyanza District, Southern Province, as a women's representative. In October 2018 she attended a World Food Day event, supporting the Rwandan government's Girinka (One Cow Per Poor Family) programme. In December 2019 she was elected to the Executive Committee of the Rwanda Chapter of the Commonwealth Women Parliamentarians (CWP). In June 2019, speaking at a commemoration ceremony held in Mukingo Sector, Nyanza District, she reminded her audience of the importance of remembering the Rwanda genocide:

References

1979 births
Living people
Members of the Chamber of Deputies (Rwanda)
21st-century Rwandan women politicians
21st-century Rwandan politicians